Chenorhamphus is a genus of birds in the Australasian wren family, Maluridae.

Taxonomy and systematics 
The species of the genus Chenorhamphus were formerly classified in the genus Malurus until a 2011 analysis of mitochondrial and nuclear DNA showed high divergence between the two taxa resulting in them being re-split into separate species. The study also found them to lie in a separate clade with the genera Sipodotus and Clytomyias and distinct from the genus Malurus. This led to the subsequent re-classification of the species into their own genus, Chenorhamphus.

The genus contains two species:
 Broad-billed fairywren (Chenorhamphus grayi)
 Campbell's fairywren (Chenorhamphus campbelli)

References

External links

 
Maluridae
Bird genera
Taxa named by Émile Oustalet